The 1931 Wilberforce Green Wave football team was an American football team that represented Wilberforce College (now known as Wilberforce University) during the 1931 college football season. Led by head coach Harry C. Graves and assistant coach Corrothers, the team was recognized as the 1931 black college national champion. The team compiled an undefeated, untied 8–0 record and outscored opponents by a total of 201 to 30. Tuskegee had been undefeated in 35 previous starts.

Key players included ends Ike Robinson and Pete Fouler.

Schedule

References

Wilberforce
Central State Marauders football seasons
Black college football national champions
College football undefeated seasons
Wilberforce Green Wave football